Buhay is a Ukrainian friction drum, known as buhai in Romania.

Buhay or Buhai may also refer to:

People
Ashleigh Buhai (born  1989), South African professional golfer
Becky Buhay (1896-1953), Canadian labour activist and union organizer
Shen Buhai, Chinese essayist, philosopher, and politician
Gao Buhai, Chinese philosopher
Vladyslav Buhay is a Ukrainian footballer
 Mr. Buhay, the defendant in the R v Buhay case before the Supreme Court of Canada

Other
Buhai, a river in Romania
Buhay (album)
Buhay Party-List, Philippine party-list group

See also